Michal Lukasz Haznar (born ) is a Namibian-born rugby union Polish player for  in the Currie Cup and the Rugby Challenge. His regular position is centre.

His debut with the Polish team was against Germany in November 2021.

References

1994 births
Golden Lions players
Griquas (rugby union) players
Living people
Namibian rugby union players
Poland international rugby union players
Polish rugby union players
Rugby union players from Windhoek
Rugby union wings
South African rugby union players
Stormers players
Western Province (rugby union) players